Buševo is a village in the municipality of Kladanj, Bosnia and Herzegovina.

Climate
The climate in Buševo is warm and temperate. Buševo gets a high amount of rainfall totaling 92.6 cm per year.

Demographics 
According to the 2013 census, its population was 130.

References

Populated places in Kladanj